Georges-Andre Machia Malock (born 26 March 1988) is a Cameroonian football player who played for Chanthaburi F.C. as a striker.

Career statistics in Hong Kong
As of 24 September 2009

References

External links
 Player Information on tswpegasus.com 
 

1988 births
Living people
Cameroonian footballers
Hong Kong First Division League players
Expatriate footballers in Hong Kong
Expatriate footballers in the Maldives
Expatriate footballers in Indonesia
Cameroonian expatriates in Hong Kong
Association football forwards
Victory SC players
Persis Solo players
TSW Pegasus FC players
PSLS Lhokseumawe players
Persik Kediri players
Georges-Andre Machia
Georges-Andre Machia